Sudler House is a historic home located in Bridgeville, Sussex County, Delaware.  The original section was built about 1750, and is a two-story, six bay, frame dwelling sheathed in cypress shingles in a vernacular style.  The original three-bay section was enlarged during the Federal period. The interior features a gracefully designed staircase with square balusters has an unusual double carved bracket trim and panelled base.  Francis Asbury (1745-1816) preached here. The Sudler family owned the property from 1833 to 1971.

It was added to the National Register of Historic Places in 1974.

References

External links

Houses on the National Register of Historic Places in Delaware
Federal architecture in Delaware
Houses completed in 1750
Houses in Sussex County, Delaware
Historic American Buildings Survey in Delaware
National Register of Historic Places in Sussex County, Delaware